This is a list of the major International field hockey tournaments, in chronological order.  Tournaments included are:
Olympic Games – held every four years.
Hockey World Cup – held every four years, in between the Olympics.
Champions Trophy – scrapped since 2018.
Hockey Champions Challenge – eventually replaced by now defunct World Hockey League .
Hockey Champions Challenge II – eventually replaced by now defunct World Hockey League.
Men's FIH Pro League and Women's FIH Pro League since 2019.

Although invitational or not open to all countries, the following are also considered international tournaments:
Commonwealth Games – held ever four years between members of the Commonwealth of Nations
Sultan Azlan Shah Hockey Tournament – held annually in Malaysia, an invitational tournament.
Sultan Ibrahim Ismail Hockey Tournament -held annually for aged under-21 in Malaysia, an invitational tournament.

List of tournaments

 
international